Macalla hypoxantha is a species of snout moth in the genus Macalla. It was described by George Hampson in 1896 and is known from India, including Sikkim.

References

Moths described in 1896
Epipaschiinae